Penicillium moldavicum is an anamorph species of the genus Penicillium.

References 

moldavicum
Fungi described in 1967